Madhya Pradesh State Highway 6 (MP SH 6) is a State Highway running from Shivpuri till Goras town near Madhya Pradesh - Rajasthan border. 

A portion of this highway used to extend to Sheopur from Goras also but it has now been notified as a part of National Highway 552.

See Also
List of state highways in Madhya Pradesh

References

State Highways in Madhya Pradesh